Cúcuta Deportivo Fútbol Club S. A. is a professional Colombian football club based in Cúcuta, which plays in the Categoria Primera B.

The club was officially founded on 10 September 1924, and its first appearance in a professional league was in the 1950 Campeonato Profesional season. They play their home games at the 42,000 capacity Estadio General Santander, although in 2017 they played some of their home games at Estadio Municipal Héctor "El Zipa" González in Zipaquirá, with capacity for 7,000 people. The team plays the Clásico del Oriente Colombiano against its long-time rival Atlético Bucaramanga.
                                                                                                                            
Cúcuta Deportivo has won seven titles between domestic and international levels; the club's greatest achievements are one Primera A title in 2006-II, three Primera B titles in 1995–96, 2005 and 2018, and reaching the semi-finals of the 2007 Copa Libertadores, where they were knocked out by eventual winners Boca Juniors in the semi-finals.

The IFFHS has ranked Cúcuta Deportivo 92nd in the list of best South American clubs of the 21st century.

History

Early years 
There is some dispute regarding the founding year of Cúcuta Deportivo, but according to historian Alfredo Díaz, the club was founded on 10 September 1924 as Cúcuta Sports Club. The club's first games outside of Colombia were against a team composed of players representing Caracas, Venezuela on 23 November 1926. Two days later, on 25 November, the team played in La Guaira, Venezuela. Cúcuta Sports Club became the base of the Norte de Santander football team that took part in the first Colombian National Games (Juegos Deportivos Nacionales de Colombia) in 1928 in the city of Cali.

On 15 May 1949, the president of the Colombian football league invited the directors of Club Colpet, Chinaquillo, Guasimales, and Unión Frontera to strengthen Cúcuta Deportivo in order to compete in the new Colombian professional football league. In order to facilitate the economic reforms required to join the league, Hernando Lara Hernández bought 1,700 shares in the club in September of the same year.

Between September and November 1949, before beginning its first campaign in the Colombian league, Cúcuta played Huracán de Medellín, Universidad de Bogotá, Boca Juniors de Cali, and Atlético Bucaramanga. The latter of these, Atlético Bucaramanga, is Cúcuta's arch rival, and their games are called the clásico of Eastern Colombia.

1950–1994: Economic crisis, league runner-up 
In 1950, Cúcuta played in the professional league with a team consisting of 12 Uruguayan players.

During its first professional season, Cúcuta won its first game against the now-defunct Sporting de Barranquilla (2–1), and also defeated Atlético Bucaramanga (0–1) at Atlético's ground in the first clásico of Eastern Colombia. Luis Albert "the Martian" Miloc scored the game's only goal. Cúcuta finished the year in fifth place out of 16 teams. More Uruguayan players were brought in for the 1951–52 season, including Schubert Gambetta and Eusebio Tejera. Cúcuta finished the following year in third place out of 18 teams.

Between 1952 and 1953, the club found itself in its first economic crisis. Resolved not to be disbanded, the team's directors organized an exhibition tour in Central America. The team played in Costa Rica, El Salvador, and Guatemala and earned enough money in order to maintain its league status, which it succeeded in doing for two seasons. By 1954 the crisis had grown and the club was forced to exit the Colombian league for two years, returning in 1956. Cúcuta finished fourth in the league that year. Rolando Serrano, the earliest of the great local heroes, began his career at Cúcuta. Serrano later helped the Colombia national team qualify for the 1962 World Cup.

In 1964, Cúcuta turned in their second best season-long performance to date. Under the management of Marino Vargas Villalta, Cúcuta finished second in the Colombian league, a single point behind champions Millonarios.

Relegation
In 1995, after finishing in 16th place in the league, Cúcuta was relegated to the second division, Categoría Primera B. One year later, however, the team won the second division title and returned to the top flight, only to be promptly relegated after finishing in last place. Despite finishing second in the Primera B in 1997 to Atlético Huila, Cúcuta failed to win promotion in the league's playoffs, and remained in the second division until 2005. That year they were finally crowned Primera B champions and returned to the top flight.

The first star
On 20 December 2006, coach Jorge Luis Pinto led Cúcuta to its first ever top division championship, the 2006 Finalización. This meant the club qualified for the Copa Libertadores de América for the first time.

Cúcuta played the final against Deportes Tolima in a two-legged match. The first game was played at Cúcuta's stadium on 17 December. Rodrigo Saraz scored the only goal of the game, which Cúcuta won 1–0. In the return leg in Ibagué, the teams drew 1–1, with Macnelly Torres scoring for Cúcuta and Yulián Anchico scoring for Tolima. This result meant Cúcuta won 2–1 on aggregate and were crowned champions.

Some of the key players in this championship were Blas Pérez, Roberto Bobadilla, Charles Castro, Macnelly Torres, Nelson Florez, Lincarlo Henry, and Róbinson Zapata.

2007 Copa Libertadores
Cúcuta qualified for the 2007 Copa Libertadores by winning the Colombian league's 2006 Finalización championship. They were placed in Group 3 alongside Deportes Tolima, Grêmio from Brazil, and Cerro Porteño from Paraguay.

The team's first game was a home game against Tolima which ended 0–0. After that they traveled to Porto Alegre, Brazil to play Grêmio, another game which ended 0–0. For their third match they returned to Colombia to play Cerro Porteño in a match that ended 1–1. The match that followed was against Cerro Porteño at Estadio General Pablo Rojas in Asunción, which ended in a 2–1 loss for Cúcuta. The team rebounded, however, and defeated Grêmio 3–1 at home; for the final group stage match they visited Tolima in Ibagué and won 4–3 in a high-scoring match. This victory ensured their passage into the next round as the second-placed team in the group with 9 points, behind group winners Grêmio, who finished with 10 points.

Their second round matchup was against Mexican club Toluca. After going down 0–1 at home within two minutes, Cúcuta rebounded and won the first leg 5–1. Despite losing the second leg 2–0 in Toluca, Cúcuta advanced to the quarter-finals with a 5–3 victory on aggregate.

The quarter-finals pitted Cúcuta against Uruguayan side Nacional. The first leg was again played in Cúcuta, where the Colombian side won 2–0 through goals by Blas Pérez and Macnelly Torres. The second leg, played in Montevideo, ended in a 2–2 draw thanks to goals from Rubén Darío Bustos and Leonard Pajoy for Cúcuta. Qualification for the semi-finals was earned via this 4–2 aggregate victory.

In the semi-finals, Cúcuta played Argentine powerhouse Boca Juniors. The first leg, in Cúcuta, ended in a 3–1 victory for the Colombians, but in the second leg, at the famous La Bombonera stadium, Boca earned a 3–0 victory to defeat Cúcuta 4–3 on aggregate and advance to the finals, which they subsequently won against Grêmio.

On 22 November 2007, the club won several awards and recognitions from the Colombian branch of television network Fox Sports, due to its performance in the Copa Libertadores.

2013–2018: Relegations and promotions 
The club was relegated to the Categoría Primera B in 2013, after losing the relegation play-off against Fortaleza, and that same year the club entered a business reorganization process under the auspices of the Superintendency of Companies of Colombia to renegotiate its debts with the Cúcuta Municipality and the city's Sports Institute.

For the 2015 season, Cúcuta (at the time playing in the second division) took part in a special tournament to promote two teams to Categoría Primera A, which was being expanded to 20 teams. They were placed in group A along with Atlético Bucaramanga, Deportes Quindío, and Real Cartagena, with the group winners earning promotion. The team beat Real Cartagena 3–0 and got another victory, this time 2–0 against Bucaramanga. These two victories allowed them to play against Quindío for a spot in the top tier. In that last match, Cúcuta only needed a draw to earn promotion because they had a better goal differential. The match ended in a 3–3 draw, allowing the Motilón team to return to Primera A. The team was only able to stay for that season, being relegated again at the end of the year after a poor campaign.

In the 2018 season, Cúcuta placed first in the aggregate table and reached the finals, where the club beat Unión Magdalena 3–0 on aggregate, thus achieving promotion to the Primera A for the 2019 season, where they managed to make it to the semi-finals of the Torneo Finalización, but ended in last place of their group.

Liquidation and disaffiliation from Dimayor
On 29 November 2019, the Superintendency of Companies of Colombia announced the scheduling of a hearing of breaches on 20 January 2020, since the club had stopped its payments to the local authorities in 2018. In the hearing, postponed to 24 February by mutual agreement, the involved parties reached a payment agreement with the intervention of DIMAYOR president Jorge Enrique Vélez, however, the club continued to default. On 30 July 2020, the Colombian Ministry of Sports announced the suspension of Cúcuta Deportivo's sporting license (reconocimiento deportivo) on account of the club's repeated non-compliance in the payment of wages to its players. The suspension would be lifted once the club paid its debts, however, an appeal against the decision was lodged by the club. In September, with the return to activity of the Primera A tournament following the COVID-19 pandemic, Cúcuta moved its home games to the Estadio Centenario in Armenia.

On 11 November 2020, the Superintendency of Companies announced the start of the process of liquidation of the club, since it had still failed to meet its commitments to its creditors. The decision, as well as the suspension of the club's sporting license which had been upheld by the Ministry of Sports, forced the club to forfeit its final two matches of the season against América de Cali and Atlético Nacional, as well as their Copa Colombia match against Deportes Tolima, ending the first stage of the season in last place. It also prompted DIMAYOR to exclude the club from the following stage of the competition. Eventually, on 25 November 2020 DIMAYOR's General Assembly voted to disaffiliate the club from the entity, despite the Superintendency of Companies had granted it a four-month license to continue performing its activities.

Having been disaffiliated from DIMAYOR, Cúcuta Deportivo was unable to take part in professional competitions during the 2021 season and only played some friendlies against regional amateur teams. On 23 February 2022 a new business reorganization agreement was reached after a meeting between the club's liquidator and creditors, which included the local authorities of Cúcuta. After electing a new chairman and board, Cúcuta Deportivo was eventually reinstated as a DIMAYOR member on 20 April 2022 following a meeting of the entity's General Assembly, which also decided that the team would enter the Primera B tournament in spite of being in the top tier at the time of its exclusion.

Honours
Cúcuta Deportivo's honours are a Primera A title in the 2006 Torneo Finalización and three Primera B titles in the 1995–96, 2005 and 2018 seasons. In addition to these, the club has won four friendly tournaments: the Estadio Olímpico Atahualpa Inauguration tournament in 1951, the Copa Internacional Feria del Sol in 2009, the Copa Centenario de Norte de Santander in 2010 and the Copa Alcaldía Municipio Pedro María Ureña in 2011. Its best performance in official international competitions was achieved at the 2007 Copa Libertadores, in which the team reached the semifinals.

Official
Categoría Primera A:
Champions (1): 2006–II
Runners-up (1): 1964

Categoría Primera B:
Champions (3): 1995–96, 2005, 2018

Unofficial
Torneo de Inauguración del Estadio Olímpico Atahualpa:
Champions (1): 1951
Copa Internacional Feria del Sol:
Champions (1): 2009
Copa Centenario de Norte de Santander:
Champions (1): 2010
Copa Alcaldía Municipio Pedro María Ureña:
Champions (1): 2011

Players

Current squad

Out on loan

Managers

 Jaime Rodríguez
 Luis Alberto Miloc
 Juan Hohberg (1962–63)
 Aníbal Ruiz (1967–68)
 Fernando Castro (1991)
 Álvaro de Jesús Gómez (2005)
 Jorge Luis Pinto (2006)
 Jorge Luis Bernal (2007)
 Pedro Sarmiento (1 Jan 2008 – 24 Aug 2008)
 Aníbal Ruiz (25 Aug 2008 – 9 Nov 2008)
 Jorge Luis Pinto (19 Nov 2008 – 31 Dec 2009)
 Néstor Otero (1 Nov 2009 – 5 April 2010)
 Juan Carlos Díaz (5 April 2010 – 30 June 2011)
 Jaime de la Pava (2011)
 Juan Carlos Díaz (19 Dec 2011 – 12 March 2012)
 Óscar Héctor Quintabani (19 March 2012 – 3 Nov 2012)
 Éinar Angulo (4 Nov 2012 – 16 Dec 2012)
 Guillermo Sanguinetti (17 Nov 2012 – 3 July 2013)
 Álvaro Aponte (3 July 2013–1?)
 Marcelo Fuentes (201?–)

Legal issues
Ramiro Suárez Corzo as Mayor of Cúcuta was supposedly managing Cúcuta Deportivo, indirectly overriding the club's president Angel Uriel Garcia. According to El Tiempo newspaper Suárez was supposed to sell part of the team's stocks to the people of Cúcuta, 8.5% of the total 70%, but instead he sold that 70% to his friends. He also authorized Cúcuta to be exempt of taxes until the year 2010, when the Colombian law only allows 1 year to do so.

References

External links
Official website
Website hinchas del Cúcuta Deportivo
Barra Brava Cúcuta Deportivo

 
Football clubs in Colombia
Association football clubs established in 1924
1924 establishments in Colombia
Categoría Primera A clubs
Categoría Primera B clubs